Masenabad (also Romanized as Masenābād, Masanābād, and Masnābād) is a village in Mashhad-e Miqan Rural District, in the Central District of Arak County, Markazi Province, Iran. According to the 2006 census, its population was 139, in 32 families.

References 

Populated places in Arak County